Cemal "Teddy" Yıldız (born 20 November 1976) is a Turkish professional football manager and former player who is the head coach of NOFV-Oberliga Nord club CFC Hertha 06.

Career
Yıldız played for Hertha Zehlendorf in the latter half of the 1990s, making an appearance in the final of the 1996 Berliner Landespokal as the team lost 2–0 to Tennis Borussia Berlin. Yıldız moved to his native Turkey in 2000, signing for Konyaspor in the TFF First League. After one season, he came back to Berlin where he signed for different local sides until the end of his playing career, including Türkiyemspor, SD Croatia, Tennis Borussia, Reinickendorfer Füchse and Berliner AK 07.

After becoming the assistant manager to Thomas Herbst at Tennis Borussia, Yıldız became the first team coach in August 2010 following Herbst's departure. On 19 April 2011, after a run of three straight defeats in the 2010–11 NOFV-Oberliga, Yıldız announced his resignation. However, after working as assistant manager at BFC Viktoria 1889 and Berliner AK 07, he was re-appointed as manager of Tennis Borussia in January 2017. He was dismissed in September 2017.

On 3 September 2019, Yıldız returned to Berliner AK 07 as assistant manager under Dirk Kunert.

References 

1976 births
Living people
People from Muş
Turkish footballers
Association football midfielders
Hertha Zehlendorf players
Konyaspor footballers
Türkiyemspor Berlin players
Tennis Borussia Berlin players
Füchse Berlin Reinickendorf players
Berliner AK 07 players
Turkish football managers
Tennis Borussia Berlin managers